Alan Cássio da Cruz (born 29 September 1987), known as Alan Mineiro, is a Brazilian footballer who plays as an attacking midfielder.

He is known for being a skilled dribbler and a free kick specialist.

Club statistics

References

External links

1987 births
Living people
People from Três Corações
Sportspeople from Minas Gerais
Brazilian footballers
Association football midfielders
Brazilian expatriate footballers
Brazilian expatriate sportspeople in Paraguay
Brazilian expatriate sportspeople in Japan
Expatriate footballers in Paraguay
Expatriate footballers in Japan
Campeonato Brasileiro Série B players
Campeonato Brasileiro Série A players
Paraguayan Primera División players
J1 League players
Rio Branco Sport Club players
São Bernardo Futebol Clube players
Club Guaraní players
Esporte Clube Águia Negra players
Paulista Futebol Clube players
Albirex Niigata players
Associação Ferroviária de Esportes players
Boa Esporte Clube players
Associação Desportiva Recreativa e Cultural Icasa players
Clube Atlético Bragantino players
Sport Club Corinthians Paulista players
América Futebol Clube (MG) players
Vila Nova Futebol Clube players
Fortaleza Esporte Clube players